Alfred Edward Sephton VC (19 April 1911 – 19 May 1941) was an English recipient of the Victoria Cross, the highest and most prestigious award for gallantry in the face of the enemy that can be awarded to British and Commonwealth forces.

Details
He was 30 years old, and a petty officer in the Royal Navy during the Second World War when the following deed took place for which he was awarded the VC.

On 18 May 1941 in the Mediterranean, south of Crete, Petty Officer Sephton was a director layer on HMS Coventry when she went to the assistance of a hospital ship which was being attacked by German dive-bombers. When the enemy engaged Coventry, strafing her with machine-gun fire, Petty Officer Sephton was mortally wounded, a bullet actually passing through his body and injuring an able seaman beside him. Although in great pain and partially blinded, nevertheless he stuck to his instruments and carried out his duties until the attack was over. He died of his injuries next day.

The medal
Sephton's Victoria Cross was stolen from Coventry Cathedral in 1990.

References

British VCs of World War 2 (John Laffin, 1997)
Monuments to Courage (David Harvey, 1999)
The Register of the Victoria Cross (This England, 1997)

External links
CWGC entry
Petty Officer A.E. Sephton in The Art of War exhibition at the UK National Archives
Royal Naval Museum

1911 births
1941 deaths
Military personnel from Cheshire
People from Warrington
People who died at sea
Burials at sea
Royal Navy sailors
Royal Navy personnel killed in World War II
Royal Navy recipients of the Victoria Cross
British World War II recipients of the Victoria Cross
Deaths by airstrike during World War II